James Maxwell (born 9 December 2001) is a Scottish footballer, who plays as a left-back for EFL League Two club Doncaster Rovers.

Career
Maxwell was with Ayr United and Falkirk's youth academies before signing as a pro youth for Rangers.    

Maxwell signed on loan with Scottish Championship club Queen of the South for the 2020-21 season. Maxwell had 32 appearances and scored 5 goals for the Dumfries club.

During July 2021, Maxwell signed on loan with Scottish Championship club Ayr United for the 2021-22 season.

On 7 July 2022, Maxwell confirmed that he had left Rangers.

On 21 July 2022, Maxwell moved south of the border for the first time in his career when he joined EFL League Two club Doncaster Rovers.

Career statistics

Notes

References

2001 births
Living people
Scottish footballers
Association football defenders
Ayr United F.C. players
Falkirk F.C. players
Rangers F.C. players
Queen of the South F.C. players
Doncaster Rovers F.C. players
Scottish Professional Football League players